Juan Luis Mora (born 17 September 1979) is a former Chilean footballer. 

He last played for Rangers de Talca.

References
 Profile at BDFA 
 

1979 births
Living people
Chilean footballers
Deportes Linares footballers
Rangers de Talca footballers
Deportes Temuco footballers
Universidad de Concepción footballers
C.D. Arturo Fernández Vial footballers
Chilean Primera División players
Primera B de Chile players
People from Linares

Association football goalkeepers